Jacob Philadelphia was a magician, physicist, mechanic, juggler, astrologer, alchemist, and Kabbalist.

Biography
He is believed to have been born in Philadelphia, Pennsylvania on August 14, 1735 as Jacob Meyer. Dr Christopher Witt, the associate of Johannes Kelpius, was chiefly responsible for his education. Meyer's patron in England was Prince Henry, Duke of Cumberland and Strathearn, for whom he performed astrology, magic, and alchemy.

When he converted to Christianity, Jacob Meyer took the name of Jacob Philadelphia in homage to the home city of the American scientist and statesman Benjamin Franklin. He was also known by the names Meyer Philadelphia and Philadelphus Philadelphia. Meyer became a member of the occult Rosicrucian order. After the death of his patron in 1756, Meyer began to perform in public. He exhibited his skills in Ireland, Portugal, and Spain. In 1771, he performed in St. Petersburg for Catherine II of Russia. Also, in Constantinople, he had Sultan Mustapha III as an audience. The year 1773 found him chasing away ghosts for Kaiser Joseph II, Holy Roman Emperor in Vienna at a charge of 300 Thalers. In Potsdam and Berlin, he had difficulty with Friedrich the Great, who was alarmed after Meyer read his mind. Friedrich was also averse to Meyer's Rosicrucianism and subsequently banished the magician from Prussia.

In James Randi's view, Meyer was probably the "first American-born...magician to attain any fame". He was an early pioneer of phantasmagoria, a performance magic show with a focus on the appearance of ghostly figures. His shows involved "magic lantern, mirror effects, and various magnetic and electrical (usually high-voltage) demonstrations"

The Little Treatise on Strange and Suitable Feats was written by Meyer in 1774. In 1758, he toured England. Although he presented himself as being a scientist, many took him for a magician. In 1777 he refused to lecture in Göttingen because of an extravagant, satirical poster campaign by Georg Christoph Lichtenberg who libeled him as being a magician and miracle-worker. Among other things, the poster was designed to make people think that they would be forced into harmful situations if they attended the lecture. Lichtenberg's Avertissement placard became widely known and damaged Meyer's career. His final lecture was given in 1781 in Switzerland. In 1783, made a business proposition involving the use of occult powers to Frederick the Great, who declined the offer.

Meyer retired in Köthen, Germany, and died at the turn of the century

Biographical novel
A biographical novel has been written by Marion Philadelphia in German about the life of Jacob Philadelphia. Its title is Der Gaukler der Könige (The Conjurer of Kings).

See also
 List of magicians
 Georg Christoph Lichtenberg
 Lichtenberg's Avertissement

References

1735 births
1795 deaths
American magicians
American alchemists
Converts to Christianity from Judaism
Writers from Philadelphia
18th-century alchemists